The 1994 Grambling State Tigers football team represented Grambling State University as a member of the Southwestern Athletic Conference (SWAC) during the 1994 NCAA Division I-AA football season. The Tigers were led by head coach Eddie Robinson in his 52nd year and finished the season with a record of nine wins and three losses (9–3, 6–1 SWAC). The Tigers offense scored 479 points while the defense allowed only 262 points. This was the final winning season during Eddie Robinson's tenure as head coach at Grambling.

Schedule

Team players drafted into the NFL

Reference:

References

Grambling State
Grambling State Tigers football seasons
Southwestern Athletic Conference football champion seasons
Grambling State Tigers football